Plectroglyphidodon sindonis is a species of damselfish in the family Pomacentridae. It is found in the Pacific Ocean.

Distribution and habitat
This fish only occurs naturally in the Pacific Ocean around Hawaii.

Description
It has 12 dorsal spines, 19 to 20 dorsal soft rays, two anal spines, and 15 to 16 anal soft rays. They are brown with two vertical white stripes.

Ecology

Diet
Benthic algae and small invertebrates make up the diet for this fish.

Parasites
Parasites of this fish include Echinoplectanum plectropomi, Mitotrema anthostomatum, Pacificreadium serrani, and Trochopus plectropomi.

In the aquarium
This fish is found in many aquariums as a hobby fish.

References

sindonis
Fish described in 1903